Idrissa Sangaré (born 18 April 1987) is a Malian international footballer who plays for CO de Bamako, as a defender.

Career
Born in Mopti, Sangaré has played club football for CO de Bamako.

He made his international debut for Mali in 2013.

References

1987 births
Living people
Malian footballers
Mali international footballers
CO de Bamako players
Association football defenders
21st-century Malian people
Mali A' international footballers